Treasure Cay Airport  is an airport serving Treasure Cay, in the Abaco Islands in The Bahamas.

Facilities

The building has been torn down and they are operating out of a travel trailer.  No more than 15 planes arrive/depart a day, most to Florida and some to Nassau.

Airlines and destinations

References

External links
 
 

Airports in the Bahamas
Abaco Islands